Brian Sherratt may refer to:

Brian Sherratt (educator) (born 1942), British educator, headmaster of Great Barr School
Brian Sherratt (footballer) (1944-2021), British footballer